The 2022 United States House of Representatives elections in Virginia were held on November 8, 2022, to elect the 11 U.S. representatives from the state of Virginia, one from each of the state's 11 congressional districts. The elections coincide with other elections to the House of Representatives. Pursuant to state law, primaries organized through the Department of Elections were held on June 21, 2022 (the third Tuesday of June). However, some Republican firehouse primaries were held on dates as late as May 21, 2022.

Redistricting

Bipartisan Commission 
Following the passage of Question 1 in the 2020 elections, a bipartisan redistricting commission was created. The commission holds 16 members, 4 from the House of Delegates, 4 from the Senate of Virginia, and 8 citizens. The commission had within 60 days following the release of the 2020 census data or till July 1st, 2021, whichever is later, to approve a map. Then the map has to be approved by the General Assembly.

Failure of the Commission
As the 2020 census data was released on August 12th, 2021 the deadline was set to October 11th, 2021. Early in the commission meetings the Democrat and Republican sides both hired partisan map makers and legal advisers. The hiring of partisan map makers created worry they would cause the commission to become too partisan to create a jointly agreed compromise map. This was proved true after it became increasingly clear that the commission wouldn't create a Congressional map within the deadline after it failed to create any progress on a starting draft for the General Assembly maps, which it had solely focused on. The failure of the commission was shown even more clearly when on October 7th out of growing frustration from the lack of compromise, 3 Democratic members of the commission walked out, breaking any chance for a last-minute deal.  After the walkout no other progress was made and the deadline passed, handing the redistricting process over to the Virginia Supreme Court.

Virginia Supreme Court
Following the new rules established by Question 1 the court ordered both Democrats and Republicans to create a list of nominees to be selected as special masters in creating a map. However, after an initial review, the court threw out 1 of the 3 Republican nominees and ordered a replacement as they found past ties to Republican leadership.  Once the Republican list was re-submitted the court started reviewing both parties' lists again and picked Sean Trende as the Republican nominee and Bernard Grofman as the Democratic nominee.  On December 8th the two special masters had announced the completion of the draft map for the House of Representatives. However, following the announcement it came with public backlash over the handling of incumbents, mostly around the new 7th district going from the Richmond suburbs, where the incumbent  Abigail Spanberger lives, alongside the rural regions around Richmond to mostly Prince William County and Stafford County in the heavily suburban Northern Virginia. Following the public comment period, the map was almost completely redrawn and a revised map was released on December 28th. With the new maps announcement, it ended the 5, nearly 6, month redistricting process.

New map

The new court approved map completely changed every district, with the largest changes being in the 1st, 2nd, 7th, and 10th districts. The first district previously held a significant southern portion of Northern Virginia and was replaced with the western parts of Henrico and Chesterfield counties. These changes shifted the district from Republican +11% to Republican +14%, according to FiveThirtyEight. The second district shifted more Republican as it previously held Williamsburg City, York County, eastern portions of Hampton City, and northern parts of Norfolk City. These regions were generally Democratic and was replaced with the southern portions of Chesapeake City, Suffolk City, Isle of Wight County, Franklin City, and eastern parts of Southampton County which are generally Republican areas. These changes made the district's partisan lean Republican +6% from Republican +2%, according to FiveThirtyEight.  Unlike the 1st and 2nd districts the new 7th district was entirely remade. The new district now holds the eastern parts of Prince William County and the entirety of Culpeper, Madison, Greene, Orange, Stafford, King George, Spotsylvania, and Caroline counties. These areas combined are more Democratic then the former Richmond suburbs and rural central Virginia counties which made up the old 7th district, causing a shift from Republican +5% to Democratic +2%, according to FiveThirtyEight. The last major change district was the 10th district, which removed Frederick County, Winchester City, Clarke County, and western parts of Fairfax County. These were replaced by the addition of western Prince William County, Fauquier County, and Rappahannock County. These changes caused the district to shift from Democratic +12% to +8%, according to FiveThirtyEight.

Statewide results

District 1 

The 1st district is based in the western Chesapeake Bay and includes portions of suburban Richmond. Within the district are western Henrico and Chesterfield counties. Other localities in the district include Colonial Beach, Mechanicsville, and Williamsburg. The incumbent is Republican Rob Wittman, who was re-elected with 58.2% of the vote in 2020. On November 8, 2022, Congressman Rob Wittman was re-elected.

Republican primary

Candidates

Nominee
 Rob Wittman, incumbent U.S. Representative

Declined
 Amanda Chase, state senator, and candidate for governor in 2021(redistricted from Virginia's 7th congressional district)

Democratic primary

Candidates

Nominee
 Herb Jones, U.S. Army veteran and Democratic nominee for SD-03 in 2019

Withdrew
 Stewart Navarre, U.S. Marine Corps Veteran

Independents

Candidates
 David Foster, U.S. Navy veteran

General election

Predictions

Endorsements

Results

District 2

The 2nd district is based in Hampton Roads, containing the cities of Chesapeake, Franklin, Suffolk, and Virginia Beach. Virginia's Eastern Shore is also located within the district. The incumbent is Democrat Elaine Luria, who was re-elected with 51.6% of the vote in 2020. Despite her home in Norfolk no longer being in the district, Luria ran for re-election in this seat. On November 8, 2022, State Senator Jen Kiggans won the election to the district, unseating Luria.

Democratic primary

Candidates

Nominee
 Elaine Luria, incumbent U.S. Representative

Withdrawn
 Neil Smith, U.S. Navy veteran

Republican primary

Candidates

Nominee
 Jen Kiggans, state senator, nurse practitioner, and U.S. Navy veteran

Eliminated in primary
 Tommy Altman, U.S. Air Force veteran
 Andy Baan, U.S. Navy veteran
 Jarome Bell, U.S. Navy veteran, and candidate for Virginia's 2nd congressional district in 2020

Endorsements

Polling

Results

General election

Failed to Qualify 
 Garry Hubbard (Green), former candidate for Virginia Beach City Council

Endorsements

Predictions

Polling 

Elaine Luria vs. Jarome Bell

Generic Democrat vs. generic Republican

Results

District 3

The 3rd district encompasses the inner Hampton Roads, including parts of Hampton and Norfolk, as well as Newport News. The incumbent is Democrat Bobby Scott, who was reelected with 68.4% of the vote in 2020. On November 8, 2022, Congressman Bobby Scott was re-elected.

Democratic primary

Candidates

Nominee
 Bobby Scott, incumbent U.S. Representative

Failed to Qualify
Luis Rivera, Entrepreneur

Republican primary

Candidates

Nominee
 Terry Namkung, U.S. Air Force veteran

Eliminated in primary
 Theodore "Ted" Engquist, minister

Failed to Qualify
 Madison Downs, teacher and Republican candidate for VA-03 in 2020

Results

General election

Predictions

Endorsements

Results

District 4

The 4th district takes in the city of Richmond and portions of Southside Virginia following Interstate 95. Within the district are the cities of Colonial Heights, Emporia, Hopewell, and Petersburg. The incumbent was Democrat Donald McEachin, who was re-elected with 61.6% of the vote in 2020. 

On November 8, 2022, McEachin was re-elected; however, he died on November 28. A special election was held on February 21, 2023.

Democratic primary

Candidates

Nominee
 Donald McEachin, incumbent U.S. Representative

Republican primary

Candidates

Nominee
 Leon Benjamin, pastor, U.S. Navy veteran, and nominee for Virginia's 4th congressional district in 2020

Failed to qualify
 Mike Dickinson, strip club owner and perennial candidate

General election

Predictions

Endorsements

Results

District 5

The 5th district includes the majority of Southside Virginia. Within the district are the cities of Charlottesville, Danville, and Lynchburg. The incumbent Representative is Bob Good, who was elected with 52.4% of the vote in 2020, after ousting then Representative Denver Riggleman in the Republican convention. On November 8, 2022, Congressman Bob Good was re-elected.

Republican convention

Candidates

Nominee
Bob Good, incumbent U.S. Representative

Eliminated at convention
 Dan Moy, U.S. Air Force veteran and Charlottesville GOP Chair

Withdrawn
 Kimberly Lowe, farmer and activist (Running in 9th)

Endorsements

Results

Democratic primary

Candidates

Nominee
 Josh Throneburg, business owner

Failed to Qualify
 Andy Parker, former Henry County Supervisor and father of Alison Parker
 Warren McClellan. farmer

Withdrawn
 Shadi Ayyas, physician (Running in 10th)
 Lewis Combs, prosecutor

General election

Predictions

Endorsements

Results

District 6

The 6th district is located in western Virginia taking in the Shenandoah Valley along Interstate 81. The district is anchored at the southern end by the cities of Roanoke and Salem. The incumbent is Republican Ben Cline, who was re-elected with 64.6% of the vote in 2020. On November 8, 2022, Congressman Ben Cline was re-elected.

Republican primary

Candidates

Nominee
 Ben Cline, incumbent U.S. Representative

Eliminated in primary
 Merritt Hale, United States Navy veteran

Results

Democratic convention

Candidates

Nominee
Jennifer Lewis, nominee for this district in 2018

General election

Endorsements

Predictions

Results

District 7

The 7th district is based in Northern Virginia and encompasses suburban, exurban, and rural areas of Washington. The district contains  Bowling Green, Culpeper, the city of Fredericksburg, Stanardsville, Woodbridge, and a small sliver of Albemarle County. The incumbent is Democrat Abigail Spanberger, who was re-elected with 50.8% of the vote in 2020. The district was radically redrawn, and no longer includes her home in Henrico County. Despite this, Spanberger ran for re-election in this seat. On November 8, 2022, Congresswoman Abigail Spanberger was re-elected.

Democratic primary

Candidates

Nominee
 Abigail Spanberger, incumbent U.S. Representative

Declined
Hala Ayala, member of the Virginia House of Delegates from the 51st district (2018–2022), nominee for Lieutenant Governor in 2021 (running for state senate in 2023)
Jennifer Carroll Foy, former member of the Virginia House of Delegates from the 2nd district (2018-2020), candidate for Governor in 2021 (running for state senate in 2023)
Jeremy McPike, State Senator
Elizabeth Guzmán, member of the Virginia House of Delegates, and Candidate for Lieutenant Governor in 2021
Babur Lateef, Chairman of the Prince William County School Board.

Republican primary

Candidates

Nominee
 Yesli Vega, Prince William County Supervisor, Chair of Latinos for Glenn Youngkin in 2021 Virginia gubernatorial election

Eliminated in primary
 Derrick Anderson, attorney and former U.S. Army Special Forces Green Beret
 Gina Ciarcia, teacher and Republican nominee for HD-02 in 2021
 Bryce Reeves, state senator, and candidate for Lt. Governor in 2017
 David Ross, Vice-Chair of the Spotsylvania County Board of Supervisors
 Crystal Vanuch, Chair of the Stafford County Board of Supervisors

Did not qualify
 Michael Monteforte, federal contractor and small business owner

Withdrawn
 Gary Adkins, U.S. Air Force veteran
 John Castorani, U.S. Army veteran and candidate for Alabama's 1st congressional district in 2020 (endorsed Derrick Anderson)
 Amanda Chase, state senator, and candidate for governor in 2021. (redistricted to Virginia's 1st congressional district and withdrew) (endorsed David Ross)
 Gary Barve, businessman
 Taylor Keeney, former staffer for Governor Bob McDonnell
 John McGuire, state delegate, and candidate for Virginia's 7th congressional district in 2020 (Endorsed Yesli Vega and Running for SD-10)
 Tina Ramirez, nonprofit executive, congressional foreign policy adviser, founder of the congressional international religious freedom caucus, and candidate for Virginia's 7th congressional district in 2020 {Running for SD-12)

Declined
Nick Freitas, State Delegate, Nominee for Virginia's 7th congressional district in 2020, and candidate for U.S. Senate in 2018. (Reeves for Congress Campaign Chair)

Endorsements

Results

General election

Predictions

Endorsements

Polling

Results

District 8

The 8th district is based in northern Virginia and encompasses the inner Washington, D.C. suburbs, including Arlington, Alexandria, and Falls Church. The incumbent is Democrat Don Beyer, who was re-elected with 75.8% of the vote in 2020. On November 8, 2022, Congressman Don Beyer was re-elected.

Democratic primary

Candidates

Nominee
Don Beyer, incumbent U.S. Representative, former Ambassador to Switzerland and Liechtenstein and Lieutenant Governor

Eliminated in primary
Victoria Virasingh, IT worker

Endorsements

Results

Republican Convention

Candidates

Nominee
 Karina Lipsman, former Department of Defense contractor

Eliminated at convention
 Monica Carpio, economist
 Jeff Jordan, defense contractor and Republican nominee for VA-08 in 2020
 Heerak Christian Kim, educator
 Kezia Tunnell, businesswoman and Republican candidate for TX-19 in 2020

Other candidates

Declared
 Heerak Christian Kim, educator and former Republican candidate for this seat (write-in) 
 Teddy Fikre, business consultant (Independent)

Results

General election

Predictions

Results

District 9

The 9th district takes in rural southwest Virginia, including Abingdon, Blacksburg, Bristol and Norton. The incumbent is Republican Morgan Griffith, who was re-elected with 94% of the vote in 2020 without opposition from any party. Despite his home in Salem no longer being in the district. Griffith is running for re-election in this seat. On November 8, 2022, Congressman Morgan Griffith was re-elected.

Republican primary

Candidates

Nominee
 Morgan Griffith, incumbent U.S. Representative

Failed to Qualify
 Kimberly Lowe, farmer and activist

Democratic primary

Candidates

Nominee
Taysha DeVaughan, community activist

General election

Predictions

Endorsements

Results

District 10

The 10th district is based in northern Virginia and the D.C. metro area, encompassing Fauquier, Loudoun, and Rappahannock counties, the independent cities of Mansassas and Manassas Park, and portions of Fairfax and Prince William counties. The incumbent is Democrat Jennifer Wexton, who was re-elected with 56.5% of the vote in 2020. Wexton was re-elected.

Democratic primary

Candidates

Nominee
 Jennifer Wexton, incumbent U.S. Representative

Withdrawn
 Shadi Ayyas, physician

Endorsements

Republican primary

Candidates

Nominee
 Hung Cao, U.S. Navy veteran

Eliminated in primary
 John Beatty, Loudoun County School Board member
 Dave Beckwith, U.S. Air Force veteran
 Mike Clancy, tech company manager
 Theresa Ellis, Manassas city councilor
 John Henley, U.S. Air Force veteran 
 Jeanine Lawson, Prince William County supervisor
 Caleb Max, businessman
 Jeff Mayhugh
Brandon Michon, real estate financier
 Brooke Taylor, former college professor

Withdrawn
 Monica Carpio, economist (running in the 8th district)
 Paul Lott, author, and education consultant.
 Clay Percle, defense industry consultant, and U.S. Air Force veteran

Endorsements

Results

General election

Predictions

Debates and forums

Both candidates agreed to 4 joint-events.

The first forum was the hosted by The Arc of Northern Virginia (NoVA) which is an advocacy center for disabled children and seniors. They have been hosting these forums since 2020. It was the only online event both Wexton and Cao would partake in. It also included the Democratic and Republican candidates for the 7th and 10th congressional districts. The Arc of NoVA asked their own questions, questions sent to them ahead of time, and questions taken from a Facebook chat. As mentioned at the start of the forum, all candidates were sent the questions they were planning to ask as well as questions that were sent in.

Polling

Results

District 11

The 11th district encompasses portions of suburban Washington, D.C., including the city of Fairfax and portions of Fairfax County. The incumbent is Democrat Gerry Connolly, who was re-elected with 77.6% of the vote in 2020. On November 8, 2022, Congressman Gerry Connolly was re-elected.

Democratic primary

Candidates

Nominee
 Gerry Connolly, incumbent U.S. Representative

Did not Qualify
 Dereje Gerawork, community activist, talk show host.
 Ally Dalsimer, DoD Natural Resources Program Manager (2015-2019), Obama Climate Task Force

Endorsements

Republican firehouse convention

Candidates

Nominee
 Jim Myles, retired federal judge

Eliminated in convention
 Manga Anantatmula, businesswoman and Republican nominee for VA-11 in 2020
 Joe Babb, former U.S. diplomat
 Barbara Banks
 Matthew Chappell, U.S. Army veteran

Results

General election

Predictions

Results

Notes

Partisan clients

References

External links
Official campaign websites for 1st district candidates
 David Foster (I) for Congress
 Herb Jones (D) for Congress
 Rob Wittman (R) for Congress

Official campaign websites for 2nd district candidates
 Jen Kiggans (R) for Congress
 Elaine Luria (D) for Congress

Official campaign websites for 3rd district candidates
 Terry Namkung (R) for Congress
 Bobby Scott (D) for Congress

Official campaign websites for the 4th district candidates
 Leon Benjamin (R) for Congress
 Donald McEachin (D) for Congress

Official campaign websites for 5th district candidates
 Bob Good (R) for Congress
 Joshua Throneburg (D) for Congress

Official campaign websites for 6th district candidates
 Ben Cline (R) for Congress
 Jennifer Lewis (D) for Congress

Official campaign websites for 7th district candidates
 Abigail Spanberger (D) for Congress
 Yesli Vega (R) for Congress

Official campaign websites for 8th district candidates
 Don Beyer (D) for Congress
 Teddy Fikre (I) for Congress
 Karina Lipsman (R) for Congress

Official campaign websites for 9th district candidates
 Taysha DeVaughan (D) for Congress
 Morgan Griffith (R) for Congress

Official campaign websites for 10th district candidates
 Hung Cao (R) for Congress
 Jennifer Wexton (D) for Congress

Official campaign websites for 11th district candidates
 Jim Myles (R) for Congress
 Gerry Connolly (D) for Congress

Virginia
2022
House